Dansbandsnatt is a studio album released on 27 January 2010 by Swedish dansband Torgny Melins.

Track listing

Charts

Weekly charts

Year-end charts

References

2010 albums
Torgny Melins albums
Swedish-language albums